Rudolf Keyper (25 October 1880 – 28 February 1973) was a Danish equestrian. He competed in the individual dressage event at the 1912 Summer Olympics.

References

External links
 

1880 births
1973 deaths
Danish male equestrians
Olympic equestrians of Denmark
Equestrians at the 1912 Summer Olympics
Sportspeople from Frederiksberg